Assassinio nella cattedrale (Murder in the Cathedral) is an opera in two acts and an intermezzo by the Italian composer Ildebrando Pizzetti. The libretto is an adaptation by the composer of an Italian translation of T. S. Eliot's 1935 play Murder in the Cathedral. The opera was first performed at La Scala, Milan, on 1 March 1958. The opera was performed for the first time in Canada the following year at the Montreal Festivals.

Roles

Recordings
Assassinio nella cattedrale – La Scala Orchestra and Chorus conducted by Gianandrea Gavazzeni with Nicola Rossi-Lemeni as Thomas Becket. Recorded live at the La Scala premiere, 1 March 1958. Label: Opera d'Oro
Assassinio nella cattedrale – Orchestra Sinfonica Nazionale della RAI di Torino conducted by Ildebrando Pizzetti with Nicola Rossi-Lemeni as Thomas Becket. Radio broadcast recorded live in Turin, 5 December 1958. Label: Stradivarius
Assassinio nella cattedrale — Vienna State Opera Orchestra and Chorus conducted by Herbert von Karajan with Hans Hotter as Thomas Becket. Recorded live at the Vienna State Opera, 9 March 1960. Sung in German. Label: Deutsche Grammophon
Assassinio nella cattedrale – Orchestra Sinfonica della Provincia di Bari conducted by Piergiorgio Morandi with Ruggero Raimondi as Thomas Becket. Recorded live at the Basilica di San Nicola, Bari on 22 December 2006. Label: Decca

References

Further reading
Gelli, Piero (ed.) (2005). Assassinio nella cattedrale. Dizionario dell'opera, p. 102. Baldini Castoldi Dalai (republished on operamanager.it). Retrieved 17 February 2016 

Operas by Ildebrando Pizzetti
Italian-language operas
1958 operas
Adaptations of works by T. S. Eliot
Cultural depictions of Thomas Becket
Operas
Opera world premieres at La Scala
Operas based on plays
Operas set in England